John Myrdal (born June 3, 1971) is an American sailor. He competed in the Laser event at the 2000 Summer Olympics.

References

External links
 

1971 births
Living people
American male sailors (sport)
Olympic sailors of the United States
Sailors at the 2000 Summer Olympics – Laser
Sportspeople from Honolulu
Hawaii Rainbow Warriors and Rainbow Wahine sailors